Ernest Shalita (1936-2012) was an Anglican bishop in Uganda: he served as the inaugural  Bishop of Muhabura from 1990 to 2002.

Shalita was born  in Rwaramba, Kisoro District. He was educated at Rwaramba Church School, Seseme Primary School, Mbarara High School and Bishop Stuart University.  He was ordained  in 1965. He served in Kigezi diocese  and was the first Vicar general of All Saints Cathedral Nakasero.

References

Anglican bishops of Muhabura
21st-century Anglican bishops in Uganda
Uganda Christian University alumni
20th-century Anglican bishops in Uganda
People from Kisoro District
1936 births
2012 deaths
People educated at Mbarara High School
Bishop Stuart University alumni